The 1981 Chicago Cubs season was the 110th season of the Chicago Cubs franchise, the 106th in the National League and the 66th at Wrigley Field. The Cubs finished the first-half in last place at 15-37, 17½ games behind the Philadelphia Phillies, and the second-half in fifth place at 23-28, six games behind the eventual NL East Champion Montreal Expos in the National League East. It was also the final season for the Cubs under the Wrigley family ownership, as the Tribune Company took over the club late in the year.

Offseason 
 December 9, 1980: Bruce Sutter was traded by the Cubs to the St. Louis Cardinals for Leon Durham, Ken Reitz, and a player to be named later. The Cardinals completed the deal by sending Tye Waller to the Cubs on December 22.
 December 12, 1980: Jerry Martin, Jesús Figueroa and a player to be named later was traded by the Cubs to the San Francisco Giants for Joe Strain and Philip Nastu. The Cubs completed the deal by sending Mike Turgeon (minors) to the Giants on August 11, 1981.
 February 26, 1981: George Riley was released by the Cubs.
 March 28, 1981: Dennis Lamp was traded by the Cubs to the Chicago White Sox for Ken Kravec.

Regular season

Season standings

Record vs. opponents

Notable transactions 
 April 6, 1981: Butch Benton was acquired by the Cubs from the New York Mets as part of a conditional deal.
 June 8, 1981: Joe Carter was drafted by the Cubs in the 1st round (2nd pick) of the 1981 Major League Baseball draft. Player signed June 12, 1981.
 June 12, 1981: Rick Reuschel was traded by the Cubs to the New York Yankees for Doug Bird, a player to be named later, and $400,000. The Yankees completed the trade by sending Mike Griffin on August 5.
 August 19, 1981: The Cubs traded players to be named later to the New York Yankees for Pat Tabler. The Cubs completed the trade by sending Bill Caudill to the Yankees on April 1, 1982, and Jay Howell to the Yankees on August 2, 1982.

Roster

Player stats

Batting

Starters by position 
Note: Pos = Position; G = Games played; AB = At bats; H = Hits; Avg. = Batting average; HR = Home runs; RBI = Runs batted in

Other batters 
Note: G = Games played; AB = At bats; H = Hits; Avg. = Batting average; HR = Home runs; RBI = Runs batted in

Pitching

Starting pitchers 
Note: G = Games pitched; IP = Innings pitched; W = Wins; L = Losses; ERA = Earned run average; SO = Strikeouts

Other pitchers 
Note: G = Games pitched; IP = Innings pitched; W = Wins; L = Losses; ERA = Earned run average; SO = Strikeouts

Relief pitchers 
Note: G = Games pitched; W = Wins; L = Losses; SV = Saves; ERA = Earned run average; SO = Strikeouts

Farm system

Notes

References 

1981 Chicago Cubs season at Baseball Reference

Chicago Cubs seasons
Chicago Cubs season
Chicago Cubs